The following is a list of notable deaths in July 2004.

Entries for each day are listed alphabetically by surname. A typical entry lists information in the following sequence:
 Name, age, country of citizenship at birth, subsequent country of citizenship (if applicable), reason for notability, cause of death (if known), and reference.

July 2004

1
Peter Barnes, 73, British screenwriter and playwright, stroke.
Marlon Brando, 80, American actor (The Godfather, On the Waterfront, A Streetcar Named Desire), Oscar winner (1954, 1973), pulmonary fibrosis.
Ettore Cella, 90, Swiss actor and film director.
Sir Richard May, 65, British former presiding judge, International Criminal Tribunal for the Former Yugoslavia.

2
Sophia de Mello Breyner Andresen, 84, Portuguese writer and poet.
Jeillo Edwards, 61, Sierra Leonean actress, first black actor to appear on "The Bill".
Sir John Kay, 60, British jurist, Lord Justice of Appeal.
Sir Jan Lewando, 90, British businessman.
James MacKay, 85, American politician (U.S. Representative for Georgia's 4th congressional district from 1965 to 1967).
John Cullen Murphy, 85, American comic strip artist (Prince Valiant).
Gareth Payne, 68, Welsh rugby union international player.
Sky Beauty, 14, American thoroughbred.
Ponkunnam Varkey, 94, Indian writer and activist.

3
John Barron, 83, English actor.
Lionel van Brabant, 77, Belgian Olympic cyclist.
Michael Curtis, 84, British newspaper editor and executive.
Freddy de Vree, 64, Belgian poet and literary critic.
Jimmy Mack, 70, Scottish radio personality.
James Marshall Sprouse, 80, American federal judge (Senior Judge of the United States Court of Appeals for the Fourth Circuit).
Andrian Nikolayev, 74, Russian cosmonaut.

4
Jean-Marie Auberson, 84, Swiss orchestra conductor.
Paul Lin Ta-kuang, 84, Canadian political scientist and peace activist.
Frank Robinson, British street entertainer.
Plato A. Skouras, 74, American movie producer (Apache Warrior, Francis of Assisi).

5
Robert Burchfield, 81, English lexicographer, Oxford English Dictionary editor.
Jim Paschal, 77, American NASCAR driver.
Andy Sabados, 87, American professional football player (The Citadel, Chicago Cardinals).
Hugh Shearer, 81, Jamaican politician and trade unionist, former Prime Minister of Jamaica.
John Stozich, 77, American politician.
Rodger Ward, 83, American racecar driver, two-time Indianapolis 500 champion.

6
Peter Birks, 62, British academic lawyer.
Peter Brayshay, 87, English cricketer.
Eric Douglas, 46, American actor and comedian, youngest son of Kirk Douglas.
Thomas Klestil, 71, Austrian diplomat and politician, Federal President of Austria, heart failure.
Pavel Lisitsian, 92, Russian opera singer.
Jimmie F. Skaggs, 59, American film actor (Catch Me If You Can, Lethal Weapon, Underworld, Cutthroat Island).
Syreeta Wright, 57, American singer and songwriter, ex-wife of Stevie Wonder.

7
Jaroslav Hules, 30, Czech motorcycle racer, suicide.
Barry Simon, 68, Australian politician.
Jeff Smith, 65, American author and television chef ("The Frugal Gourmet").

8
Paula Danziger, 59, American author.
Ernst R. G. Eckert, 99, American scientist.
Albert Friedlander, 77, German rabbi.
Alexis von Rosenberg, Baron de Redé, 82, French banker and socialite.

9
Carlo Di Palma, 79, Italian cinematographer (Blowup, Hannah and Her Sisters, Bullets over Broadway).
Ersel Hickey, 70, American rockabilly singer.
Paul Klebnikov, 41, American journalist and historian, editor of Forbes magazine's Russian edition, murdered.
Rudy LaRusso, 66, American basketball player, five-time National Basketball Association All-Star.
Jean Lefebvre, 84, French actor.
Tony Lupien, 87, American baseball player (Boston Red Sox, Philadelphia Phillies, Chicago White Sox).
Ron Milner, 66, African-American playwright.
Bill Randle, 81, American disc jockey.
Isabel Sanford, 86, American actress (The Jeffersons, Guess Who's Coming to Dinner, Lady Sing the Blues), Emmy winner (1981).
Hugo S. Sims Jr., 82, American lawyer and politician (U.S. Representative for South Carolina's 2nd congressional district).
John Walton, 47, Irish motorsport professional.
Mike Woodin, 38, British Principal Speaker of Green Party of England and Wales and Oxford City Councillor.

10
Abdul Ghafoor, 85-86, Indian politician, Chief Minister of Bihar.
Inge Meysel, 94, German actress.
Loren Mosher, 70, American psychiatrist.
Maria de Lourdes Pintasilgo, 74, Portuguese chemical engineer and politician, former Prime Minister of Portugal.
Art Rebel, 67, American baseball player (Philadelphia Phillies, St. Louis Cardinals).

11
Joe Gold, 82, American bodybuilding pioneer and Gold's Gym founder.
Dorothy Hart, 82, American actress.
Frances Hyland, 77, Canadian theatre actress.
Sir Terry McLean, 90, New Zealand sports journalist.
Ram Charan Mehrotra, 82, Indian chemist and educationalist.
Laurance Rockefeller, 94, American businessman, conservationist and philanthropist.
Walter Wager, 79, American author.

12
Clayton Fountain, 48, American convicted murderer, heart attack.
George Mallaby, 64, British-Australian actor and scriptwriter, congestive heart failure.
Jeff Morris, 69, American actor.
Betty Oliphant, 85, English founder of Canada's National Ballet School.
James Quinn, 97, American Olympic sprinter (gold medal winner in men's 4 × 100 metres relay at the 1928 Summer Olympics).
Robert Tavener, 84, English printmaker and illustrator.
Charles DeWitt Watts, 86, American surgeon and activist.

13
Clifford Irving, 90, Manx politician.
Arthur Kane, 53, American bassist for the New York Dolls, leukemia.
Carlos Kleiber, 74, Austrian conductor.
Betty Luna, 77, American baseball player.
Michio Morishima, 80, Japanese economist.

14
Germano de Figueiredo, 71, Portuguese footballer.
Richard Jones, 87, English cricketer.
Hans A. Pestalozzi, 75, Swiss social critic.
Alex Willoughby, 59, Scottish footballer (Rangers, Aberdeen).
Arnold Ziff, 77, English businessman and philanthropist.

15
Banoo Jehangir Coyaji, 86, Indian doctor and family planning activist.
Paul H. Silverman, 79, American medical researcher in immunology, epidemiology and parasitology.
Yoko Watanabe, 51, Japanese operatic soprano.

16
George Busbee, 76, American politician, former governor of Georgia.
Frank Farmer, 91, English physicist.
Bella Lewitzky, 88, American modern dance pioneer and choreographer.
John Park, 80, Hong Kong sailor 
Charles Sweeney, 84, American U.S. Army Air Forces officer, pilot of Bockscar, the B-29 that dropped the Nagasaki atomic bomb.

17
Paul Hilmar Jensen, 74, Norwegian philatelist.
Khalil Hilmi, 94/95, Lebanese Olympic sports shooter.
Sir Julian Hodge, 99, British entrepreneur, founder of the Carlyle Trust bank.
Marty Passaglia, 85, American professional basketball player (Washington Capitols, Indianapolis Jets).
Pat Roach, 67, English professional wrestler and actor (Raiders of the Lost Ark, Auf Wiedersehen, Pet, Willow), cancer.
Robert E. Smylie, 89, American politician and Governor of Idaho from 1955 to 1967.
Susan Cullen-Ward, 63, Australian-born wife of the pretender to Albania's throne, Leka Zogu; cancer.

18
Paul Foot, 66, British journalist and campaigner.
Eoin McKiernan, 89, American expert on Irish history.
Richard Ney, 87, American actor, investment counselor, and author.
Émile Peynaud, 92, French wine expert.

19
J. Gordon Edwards, 84, American entomologist, mountaineer, and DDT advocate.
Harry Forsyth, 100, Irish cricketer and centenarian.
Kazi Abul Kasem, 91, Bangladeshi polymath.
Carvalho Leite, 92, Brazilian footballer, one of the last survivor of national team in 1930 FIFA World Cup.
Roger Marquis, 67, American baseball player (Baltimore Orioles).
Woodrow Sedlacek, 85, American racehorse trainer.
Zenko Suzuki, 93, Japanese politician, former Prime Minister of Japan.
David A. Wallace, 87, American urban planner.

20
Antonio Gades, 67, Spanish Flamenco dancer, cancer.
Adi Lady Lala Mara, 73, Fijian chieftainess and former First Lady, widow of Prime Minister and President Ratu Sir Kamisese Mara.
Jimmy MacLaren, 82, Scottish footballer.
James Williams, 53, American jazz pianist.

21
Jerry Goldsmith, 75, American film composer (Star Trek, The Omen, Alien), Oscar winner (1977).
Edward B. Lewis, 85, American biologist (Nobel Prize in Physiology or Medicine 1995).
Neal A. Maxwell, 78, American member of the Quorum of the Twelve Apostles of the Church of Jesus Christ of Latter-day Saints.
Michael Prior, 62, Irish-born British theologian.
Sir Julian Ridsdale, 89, British politician.

22
Elie Abel, 83,  Canadian-American journalist, author and academic, Alzheimer's disease.
Sacha Distel, 71, French singer.
Hume Horan, 69, American diplomat.
Illinois Jacquet, 81, United States jazz saxophonist.
George Kidd, 87, Canadian diplomat.
Ronald Sukenick, 72, American writer and literary theorist, inclusion body myositis

23
Joe Cahill, 84, Irish terrorist.
Janet Chisholm, 75, British MI6 agent during the Cold War.
Sir Alan Cook, 81, British physicist.
Rogelio Domínguez, 73, Argentine football player.
Mehmood, 72, Indian actor.
Carlos Paredes, 79, Portuguese guitar player.
Serge Reggiani, 82, French singer and actor.
Nicholas Rossiter, 43, English television producer, known for the 2003 BBC documentary The Secret Life of the Mona Lisa.

24
Lowell "Cotton" Fitzsimmons, 72, American NBA basketball coach.
Clive Geary, 82, New Zealand cricketer
Fred LaRue, 75, American part of Watergate scandal.
Ben Martin, 83, American football player and coach.
Edward D. Thalmann, 59, American hyperbaric medicine specialist, retired U.S. Navy Captain and doctor, congestive heart failure.
Wilton Mkwayi, 80, The South African anti-apartheid and ANC activist.

25
Ballarat Bandit, Canadian-born burglar, suicide by gunshot.
Francisco Romão, 61, Angolan deputy foreign minister, suicide.
Masami Shimojō, 88, Japanese  actor.
John Passmore, 89, Australian philosopher.

26
Viola Frey, 70, American artist and professor of arts.
William A. Mitchell, 92, American food scientist, inventor of Pop Rocks candy and Tang drink mix.
Rubén Gómez, 77, Puerto Rican baseball player (San Francisco Giants, Philadelphia Phillies, Cleveland Indians, Minnesota Twins).
Oğuz Aral, 68, Turkish caricaturist, creator of Avanak Avni, Kostebek Husnu, and Utanmaz Adam.
Sidney Greene, Baron Greene of Harrow Weald, 94, British life peer, trade union leader and railroad worker.

27
Michael J. Corbitt, 60, American police officer and mobster.
Carmine G. DeSapio, 95, American politician, last boss of Tammany Hall.
Manzoor Ul Haq Siddiqi, 87, Indian historian and author.
Bob Tisdall, 97, Irish athlete, won the gold medal in hurdles at the 1932 Summer Olympics.

28
Juhani Avellan, 58, Finnish Olympic weightlifter.
Jackson Beck, 92, American announcer and voice actor (The Adventures of Superman).
Francis Crick, 88, British biologist, one of the discoverers of the "double-helix" shape of DNA, cancer.
Alexei de Keyser, 36, British television producer.
Sam Edwards, 89, American actor (Twelve O'Clock High, Little House on the Prairie, Dragnet), heart failure.
Margo McLennan, 66, British actress, Prisoner, cancer.
Steve Patterson, 56, American basketball player, former center of the UCLA basketball team, coach at Arizona State University.
Eugene Roche, 75, American actor (Webster, All in the Family, Magnum, P.I., Soap), known in television commercials as the "Ajax Man".
Tiziano Terzani, 65, Italian journalist, famous for his books on Asia.

29
David Bowden, 66, Australian Anglican prelate, Bishop of Bendigo (1995–2002).
Susan Buffett, 71, American estranged wife of billionaire/investment guru Warren Buffett.
Walter Feit, 73, American mathematician.
Nafisa Joseph, 26, Indian model, MTV video jockey, Miss India 1997; suicide.
Rena Vlahopoulou, 81, Greek comedian.

30
Ali Abbasi, 42, Pakistani-born BBC Scotland travel presenter.
Ellen Auerbach, 98, German-American photographer.
Ed Melvin, 88, Serbian-American basketball player.
Hirendranath Mukherjee, 96, Indian politician.
Andre Noble, 25, Canadian television and film actor, aconitine poisoning.
Adolph Winkler Goodman, 89, American mathematician.

31
Laura Betti, 70, Italian actress.
Virginia Grey, 87, American actress (Airport, Uncle Tom's Cabin, The Women).
Elder David B. Haight, 97, American oldest member of the Quorum of the Twelve Apostles in the history of the Church of Jesus Christ of Latter-day Saints.
Allu Ramalingaiah, 81, Indian comedian.
Líber Seregni, 87, Uruguayan army officer and politician.
Ray Tolchard, 50, English cricketer and umpire.

References 

2004-07
 07